Kusŏng is a city in central North Pyongan province, North Korea.  It borders Taegwan to the north, Taechon to the east, Kwaksan and Chongju to the south, and Chonma to the west. The highest point is Chongryongsan (청룡산, 920 m).  The year-round average temperature is 8.2 °C, with a January average of -9.6 °C and an August average of 23.3 °C.  1300 millimeters of rain fall in a typical year.  22% of the county's area is cultivated; 64% is forested.

Educational institutions located in Kusong include Kusong Mechanical College and Kusong Industrial College. Historical relics include the Koryo-dynasty Kuju Castle.

Industry 
Kusong is also home to much of North Korea's military industry, with both munitions factories and uranium mines in the area.  The No.112, also known as the January 12th Factory was the site of the first successful Hwasong-12 launch, with a memorial dedicated to the successful launch nearby.

The Panghyon airfield is also located by Kusong, which is a site of missile test launches, including the first successful ICBM test launch by the DPRK.

Kusong is home to the Machine Plant managed by Ho Chol Yong, a large factory that produces tracked vehicles and tanks. This factory saw multiple extensions to it in 2016 and 2020. The factories' expansion is reflected on the increasing use of tracked transporter erector launchers.

Climate

Administrative divisions
The city is divided into 25 neighborhoods (dong) and 18 villages (ri).

See also

Geography of North Korea
Administrative divisions of North Korea
North Pyongan

Footnotes

References

 http://nk.joins.com/map/view.asp?idx=i061.htm

Further reading
Dormels, Rainer. North Korea's Cities: Industrial facilities, internal structures and typification. Jimoondang, 2014.

External links

City profile of Kusong 

Cities in North Pyongan